Idle Moments is an album by American jazz guitarist Grant Green recorded in 1963 and released on the Blue Note label in 1965. It features performances by tenor saxophonist Joe Henderson, vibraphonist  Bobby Hutcherson, pianist Duke Pearson, bassist Bob Cranshaw and drummer Al Harewood.

Recording and music
The album is best known for the title piece, a slow composition in C minor which lasts for nearly 15 minutes. Pearson, who wrote the song, explains in his liner notes to the album that the tune was meant to be much shorter. Due to the musicians repeating the main melody twice, however, there was some confusion as to whether or not one chorus would consist of 16 or 32 bars. Producer Alfred Lion was satisfied with the take, although he suggested that they do a retake to fit the song into a seven-minute limit. However, the song had a special feeling to it which no subsequent take could recapture, so it was decided to release the first take on the album. Two other songs, "Jean De Fleur" and "Django", were re-recorded in shorter renditions to compensate for the length of the title track; the extended renditions of both songs can be heard on the CD re-issues of the album.

Reception
Steve Huey of AllMusic states that Green treats the repertoire of this album "with the graceful elegance that was the hallmark of his best hard bop sessions, and that quality achieves its fullest expression here... Idle Moments is the essential first Green purchase, and some of the finest guitar jazz of the hard bop era."

The album was identified by jazz historian and journalist Scott Yanow in his essay "What is Hard Bop?" as one of the "17 Essential Hard Bop Recordings".

Track listing

"Idle Moments" (Pearson) – 14:56
"Jean De Fleur" (Green) – 6:49
"Django" (John Lewis) – 8:44
"Nomad" (Pearson) – 12:16

Bonus tracks on CD reissue in 1990:
"Jean De Fleur" [Alternate Take] - 8:09
"Django" [Alternate Take] - 13:12

Recorded on November 4 (#1, 4-6) and November 15 (#2-3), 1963.

Personnel
Grant Green – guitar
Joe Henderson – tenor saxophone
Duke Pearson – piano
Bobby Hutcherson – vibraphone
Bob Cranshaw – double bass
Al Harewood – drums

Charts

References 

1965 albums
Grant Green albums
Blue Note Records albums
Albums produced by Alfred Lion
Albums recorded at Van Gelder Studio